Clive Kolbe (16 February 1944 – 20 September 2016) was a South African cricketer. He played four first-class matches for Western Province between 1971 and 1975.

References

External links
 

1944 births
2016 deaths
South African cricketers
Western Province cricketers
Cricketers from Cape Town